This is a list of national parks of Paraguay.

Paraguay has 15 national parks.

Bella Vista National Park
Caaguazú National Park (Caazapá)
Cerro Cora National Park
Defensores del Chaco National Park
Medanos del Chaco National Park
Nacunday National Park
Paso Bravo National Park
Rio Negro National Park
Saltos del Guairá National Park
San Rafael National Park
Serrania San Luis National Park
Teniente Agripino Enciso National Park
Tifunqué National Park
Ybycuí National Park
Ypoá National Park

References
 UNEP-WCMC (2020). Protected Area Profile for Paraguay from the World Database of Protected Areas, July 2020. Available at: www.protectedplanet.net.

 
Paraguay
National parks
National parks